This is a list of electoral division results for the 2022 Australian federal election in the state of Victoria.

Overall results

Results by division

Aston

Ballarat

Bendigo

Bruce

Calwell

Casey

Chisholm

Cooper

Corangamite

Corio

Deakin

Dunkley

Flinders

Fraser

Gellibrand

Gippsland

Goldstein

Gorton

Hawke

Higgins

Holt

Hotham

Indi

Isaacs

Jagajaga

Kooyong

Lalor

La Trobe

Macnamara

Mallee

Maribyrnong

McEwen

Melbourne

Menzies

Monash

Nicholls

Scullin

Wannon

Wills

Notes

References

Victoria 2022
2022 Australian federal election